Jaime Durán Gómez (born 2 December 1981) is a Mexican former professional footballer who played as a defender.

Club career
Durán began his career in the youth ranks of Futbol Club Atlas and made his First Division debut on August 14, 1999, in a 2–3 loss to Tigres. He became a regular for Atlas appearing in a total of 139 matches in his seven years at the club, which includes 14 liguilla matches. Durán than moved on to Puebla before being loaned out to León and Monarcas Morelia in subsequent years. After having a fine season with Monarcas Morelia in which he appeared in 23 matches, he decided to explore opportunities in Europe. In January, 2009 he joined Skoda Xanthi in the Greek Super League.

International career
Jaime Durán has represented Mexico at various youth levels. He was also a member of the Mexican U23 team.

Honours
Mexico U23
CONCACAF Olympic Qualifying Championship: 2004

Statistics

External links
 

1981 births
Living people
Mexican expatriate footballers
Club Puebla players
Atlas F.C. footballers
Atlético Morelia players
Club León footballers
Xanthi F.C. players
Liga MX players
Association football defenders
C.F. Mérida footballers
Chiapas F.C. footballers
Mexico youth international footballers
Footballers from Jalisco
Footballers at the 2003 Pan American Games
Pan American Games bronze medalists for Mexico
Medalists at the 2003 Pan American Games
Pan American Games medalists in football
Mexican footballers